The Brazilian spiny tree rat (Makalata didelphoides) is a species of rodent in the family Echimyidae. It is found in Bolivia, Brazil, French Guiana, Guyana, Suriname, Venezuela, and Trinidad and Tobago where it lives in lowland tropical rainforest. There is also a population in Ecuador which is referable either to this species or to Makalata macrurus. It is nocturnal, and eats seeds.

References

Makalata
Mammals of Brazil
Mammals of Bolivia
Mammals of Venezuela
Mammals of Trinidad and Tobago
Mammals of the Caribbean
Mammals described in 1817
Taxonomy articles created by Polbot